Last Train to Blue Moon Canyon is the 13th installment in the Nancy Drew point-and-click adventure game series by Her Interactive. The game is available for play on Microsoft Windows platforms. It has an ESRB rating of E for moments of mild violence and peril. Players take on the first-person view of fictional amateur sleuth Nancy Drew and must solve the mystery through interrogation of suspects, solving puzzles, and discovering clues. There are two levels of gameplay, Junior and Senior detective modes, each offering a different difficulty level of puzzles and hints, however neither of these changes affect the actual plot of the game. The game is loosely based on a book entitled Mystery Train.

Plot
The Hardy Boys have invited Nancy Drew to join them on a train trip hosted by Lori Girard, a wealthy, young socialite. Lori has gathered the best detectives, researchers, and investigators in the country to help her solve the mystery of what happened to Jake Hurley, the man who originally owned the train. One day in 1903, the train was found in Blue Moon Canyon, Nevada with only the dead engineer on board. Jake Hurley was never seen again. As soon as the train takes off, Lori Girard mysteriously vanishes from the train. Nancy needs to find Lori and solve the mystery of Jake Hurley's disappearance.

Development

Characters

Nancy Drew - Nancy is an 18-year-old amateur detective from the fictional town of River Heights in the United States. She is the main playable character in the game, and the player must solve the mystery from her perspective.
Frank Hardy and Joe Hardy - These brothers are not strangers to mysteries. They conduct investigations and go undercover for ATAC (American Teens Against Crime). Frank and Joe are old friends of Nancy and invited her to join them on the train trip. They assist Nancy with the case and can provide her with helpful information. Frank is a brief playable character.
Lori Girard - Beautiful and rich Lori loves parties, especially a party on a haunted train with world-famous detectives bound for an unknown destination to discover a century-old secret. Lori disappears soon after the train takes off. What could have happened to her?
Tino Balducci - Tino is a hot-shot detective who recently solved a big case in Chicago. Some people say it was just luck, but Tino's out to show them that he is the best detective. How far would he be willing to go to prove it?
Charleena Purcell - Charleena's romance novels have sold millions of copies and won awards for historical excellence, but she's not interested in parties. She's done her homework about Jake Hurley though. Does she know more about the treasure than she's letting on?
John Grey - The host of TV's Ghost Chasers, John analyzes electromagnetic fields to determine if there are any ghosts in the area. He thinks that the ghost of Jake Hurley's wife may know something about Lori's disappearance. Does he know more than he's saying?
Fatima - Fatima works at the Copper Gorge Museum and Taffy Shop and wears a cartoon miner costume. She is a huge fan of Charleena Purcell. Fatima can go from nice to mean in a split second if you touch any of the artifacts in the museum without her permission.

Cast
Nancy Drew - Lani Minella
Frank Hardy - Wayne Rawley
Joe Hardy - Rob Jones
Lori Girard - Sarah Papineau
Charleena Purcell - Julia Francis
John Grey - Lowell Deo
Tino Balducci - Jeff Minnerly
Bess Marvin - Alisa Murray
George Fayne - Patty Pomplun
Fatima / Waitress - Amy Broomhall
Engineer / Oldtimer / Additional Voices - Jason Sharp

Reception
According to review aggregation website Metacritic, Nancy Drew: Last Train to Blue Moon Canyon received "generally favorable reviews" from critics.

References

2005 video games
Detective video games
Video games based on Nancy Drew
Video games based on novels
Point-and-click adventure games
Video games developed in the United States
Video games scored by Kevin Manthei
Video games set in Colorado
Video games set in Nevada
Windows games
Windows-only games
Her Interactive games
Works based on The Hardy Boys
First-person adventure games
Puzzle video games
Single-player video games
North America-exclusive video games